The Psycho Circus World Tour was a concert tour by the American rock band Kiss that started on October 31, 1998 and concluded on April 24, 1999.

Background
This concert tour was the first to implement 3-D imagery and effects with glasses included, as well as a big video screen.

In the tour program for the band's final tour, Simmons reflected on the tour:

Reception

A local reporter from the Los Angeles Times, gave the first show at Dodger Stadium a mixed review. The reporter noted on the wrinkles of the aging superstars 'creasing their Kabuki-style makeup' and the attraction of the over-the-top, 70s-vintage rock sound. Concluding the review, the reporter stated that what mattered the most to the band and the fans was 'preserving the sweetest essence of rock 'n' roll: attitude'.

A reviewer from the Milwaukee Journal Sentinel, gave the December 20, 1998 performance a positive review, stating: "The Kiss Army was treated to more than two hours of fireworks, 30-foot-high columns of flame, lascivious tongue-wriggling, pelvic gyrations, confetti blizzards, levitating drum risers, fake blood spitting, synchronized high-kicking, fire-breathing, and 3-D imagery splashed across several jumbo screens. There was music too, of course: fuzzy monster chords, throbbing bass, and anthem after anthem in praise of rocking all night and partying every day... the 3-D gimmick was a one-trick pony and not nearly as entertaining as the band's other shenanigans."

One reporter from Nashville, reported on Frehley during the show at the Nashville Arena on January 2, 1999, stating that the lead guitarist was smoking, noting on the special effects that his guitar's body had with the white smoke and Roman candle blasts fired to the arena's roof. The reporter concluded their review, stating on how every song was about how neato it is to rock and roll all night and party every day.

Setlist
"Psycho Circus"
"Shout It Out Loud"
"Deuce"
"Do You Love Me?"
"Firehouse"
"Shock Me"
"Let Me Go, Rock 'n' Roll"
"Calling Dr. Love"
"Into the Void"
"King of the Night Time World"
"God of Thunder"
"Within"
"Cold Gin"
"Love Gun"
"100,000 Years"
"Rock and Roll All Nite"
Encore
"Beth"
"Detroit Rock City"
"Black Diamond"
 
"She" and "Nothin' to Lose" only played in Dodger Stadium of Los Angeles.
"Makin' Love" was added from the second show onwards but was dropped after a few performances.
"Cold Gin" was dropped after Gothenburg show on March 5.
"I Was Made for Lovin' You" was played early in the tour but was dropped after a few performances. It was played again on the European and Latin American tour.

Tour dates

 The first show of the tour was broadcast on Fox TV's Halloween special and on the radio.
 These shows were recorded and released as a live bonus EP, which was in support of the European leg.
 Kiss was banned from performing from the venue, after setting off the pyrotechnics despite the warnings of the local fire marshal.

Postponed and cancelled dates

Box office score data

Personnel
Paul Stanley – vocals, rhythm guitar
Gene Simmons – vocals, bass
Peter Criss – drums, vocals
Ace Frehley – lead guitar, vocals

References

Sources

 

Kiss (band) concert tours
1998 concert tours
1999 concert tours